The Port of Muskogee, rebranded as Port Muskogee in January of 2023, is a regional inland port located on the McClellan-Kerr Arkansas River Navigation System in Muskogee County, Oklahoma, in the United States. It is a multi-modal local hub for the transport of goods via trucks, railroad, and barges on the Arkansas River. It is one of the farthest inland ports in the United States that remains ice-free year-round and can access the Gulf of Mexico. It is located near the confluence of the Arkansas River, Grand River and Verdigris River in Oklahoma, at River Mile 393.8 of the McClellan-Kerr Arkansas River Navigation System.

Port traffic
The largest inbound commodities were nepheline syenite, clay, steel, fertilizer, coke and sand. Other inbound cargoes brought to the Port of Muskogee by barge in 2011 included molasses, rebar, iron ore, feed products, cookie meal, asphalt, glass cullet, and granite fines. In 2011, cargoes leaving the Port of Muskogee by barge included coke, fly ash, and steel.

The port reported that in 2014, it had handled 3,564 railcars carrying  of cargo and 459 barges carrying .  For 2015, it reported serving 2,210 railcars hauling  of cargo and 452 barges with totalling  cargo.

Muskogee City-County Port Authority
The governments of Muskogee County and the City of Muskogee, Oklahoma cooperated in the formation of the Muskogee City-County Port Authority, whose principal responsibility is to promote the construction of the inland port's facilities and to recruit cargo-handling, warehousing, and transportation industries to use them. One of its earliest achievements was to break ground for the $2.5 million Muskogee Industrial Park. The port opened for business on December 31, 1970, and the first commercial barge docked there on January 3, 1971.

Facilities

Port of Muskogee Railroad
The Port of Muskogee Railroad (reporting mark: PMR) provides daily service over 5.5 miles of tracks to port industries for Class 1 interchange, cargo transfer and storage.  Both the Union Pacific Railroad and BNSF Railway offer mainline service to the port.

Notes

References

External links
 Oklahoma Digital Maps: Digital Collections of Oklahoma and Indian Territory
Official Port Muskogee website

Muskogee
Muskogee, Oklahoma
Transport infrastructure completed in 1970